SHAZAM is a United States-based interbank network and EFTPOS network headquartered in Johnston, Iowa that operates primarily in the Midwestern United States. The network was founded in 1976 and is a member-owned financial services and payments processing company.

SHAZAM is a single-source provider of debit cards, automated teller machines (ATMs), merchant, marketing, training, risk, fraud prevention and ACH Network services.

They are partnered with Presto!, a similar network covering the southeastern part of the US.

See also
ATM usage fees

References

Interbank networks
Financial services companies of the United States